Orel Leonard Hershiser IV (born September 16, 1958) is an American former baseball pitcher who played 18 seasons in Major League Baseball (MLB) from 1983 to 2000. He later became a pitching coach for the Texas Rangers from 2002 to 2005 and a broadcast color analyst for the Dodgers. He is also a professional poker player.

After playing baseball in high school at Cherry Hill High School East and at Bowling Green State University, Hershiser was drafted by the Los Angeles Dodgers in 1979. After several years in the minor leagues, he made his major league debut with the Dodgers in 1983. During his tenure with the team, Hershiser was a three-time All-Star, finishing in the top five in Cy Young voting four times in his first six full seasons. Hershiser's most successful season came in 1988, when he set a major league record by pitching 59 consecutive innings without allowing a run. He helped lead the Dodgers to a championship in the 1988 World Series, and was named the National League (NL) Championship Series Most Valuable Player (MVP) and the World Series MVP. That season, he won the NL Cy Young Award and an NL Gold Glove Award. He later pitched in two more World Series and earned the American League Championship Series MVP Award. After 12 seasons with the Dodgers, Hershiser spent time with the Cleveland Indians, San Francisco Giants, and New York Mets before returning to Los Angeles for his final season. After retirement as a player, he briefly worked as a coach and team executive for the Texas Rangers before serving as a color analyst for ESPN and then the Dodgers.

Known for his slight frame and fierce competitive spirit, Hershiser was nicknamed "Bulldog" by former Dodgers manager Tommy Lasorda, who managed Hershiser during his time with the Dodgers.

Early life
Hershiser was born in Buffalo, New York, to Orel Leonard III and Mildred Hershiser. The family moved to Detroit, Michigan, when he was six and to Toronto, Ontario, when he was 12. At age eight, Hershiser was the third-place finisher in a national hit, run, and throw competition. Hershiser played in Little League Baseball until he was 12. His father was a coach and league administrator and his mother ran the snackbar. During his family's time in Canada, he participated in ice hockey with the Don Mills Flyers in the Greater Toronto Hockey League.

His family moved again and he attended Cherry Hill High School East in Cherry Hill, New Jersey. He did not make the varsity team until his junior year as he spent his first year on the freshman team and his second year on the junior varsity. He set the single-game strikeout record for his high school in 1976 when he retired 15 batters in a game against Deptford, a record that stood for 21 years. He also remains on the school's leaderboards in career winning percentage, strikeouts and earned run average (ERA). He was an all-conference selection his senior year.

Hershiser received only a partial scholarship from Bowling Green State University. As a freshman he played little baseball and was academically ineligible as a sophomore. He left school and hitchhiked home, where his parents convinced him to return to school. He enrolled in summer school to bring his grades up and worked at his father's paper company during the summer. He grew and gained  that summer, which added  to his fastball and got him more playing time. He made the all-Mid-American Conference All-Star team his junior year, during which he pitched a no-hitter against Kent State on May 4, 1979. He won that game 2-0 despite only striking out two batters. In his only full-time season with the baseball team, in 1979, he was 6–2 with a 2.26 ERA.

Hershiser was also a member of the Sigma Phi Epsilon fraternity. One of his fraternity brothers played a joke on him on draft day, pretending to be a scout from the San Diego Padres calling to tell him he was drafted in the first round. After getting excited and starting to call his friends, he realized it was a hoax.

Professional career

Minor league career
Hershiser was selected by the Los Angeles Dodgers in the 17th round of the 1979 Major League Baseball draft. The original scouting report on him for the draft said that he had poor control, had a weak fastball, and threw the curveball incorrectly. It went on to state that he rattled easily and had questionable makeup.

The Dodgers assigned him to their Class A farm team in the Midwest League, the Clinton Dodgers. He started four games for Clinton in 1979, and appeared in 11 more out of the bullpen to finish with a 4–0 record with a 2.09 ERA.

Hershiser spent the next two seasons in AA with the San Antonio Dodgers of the Texas League. He worked primarily as a reliever at San Antonio. He was leading the league in saves at one point but then gave up 20 runs in seven innings on a road trip. He called this point the lowest of his career. He wanted to quit but the manager and pitching coach talked him out of it.

Hershiser was promoted to the Triple-A Albuquerque Dukes of the Pacific Coast League in 1982. He was 9–6 with a 3.71 ERA in 47 games, with seven starts. He was almost included in a trade with the Texas Rangers that season, but catcher Jim Sundberg wanted his contract re-written before agreeing to the deal and the Dodgers backed out of the transaction.

Hershiser won the Mulvey Award as the Dodgers top rookie in spring training in 1983 and expected to make the club but was sent back to Albuquerque where he was briefly reunited with pitching coach Rocky Giordani. He was 10–8 with a 4.09 ERA for the Dukes in 1983 in 49 games, with 10 starts and 16 saves.

MLB career

Early years (1983–1987)
Hershiser was called up to the Dodgers for the first time on September 1, 1983, and made his debut the same day, against the Montreal Expos. He came into the game in the seventh inning and retired all three batters he faced on two ground outs and a strikeout (of Tim Wallach). However, in his second inning of work he allowed a double and a single for a run and was promptly taken out of the game. In eight appearances that month, he had an ERA of 3.38.

Hershiser played winter ball in the Dominican Republic after the season and worked with pitching coach Dave Wallace on his delivery. He was almost arrested when some fireworks his friends were setting off for a New Year's party hit a Dominican General's house, but Dodger coach Manny Mota intervened on his behalf.

Hershiser made the Dodgers Opening Day roster for the 1984 season as the last man in the bullpen and was mostly used as a long reliever early on. His first win was in a 12-inning game against the St. Louis Cardinals on April 5. After getting pounded in one game, Dodger manager Tommy Lasorda gave him such a verbal lashing that was so loud teammates took to calling it "sermon on the mound". Lasorda told Hershiser that he was too timid on the mound, giving hitters too much respect. He gave him the nickname "Bulldog" so that he would have a tougher attitude in games.

Hershiser made his first start on May 26 against the New York Mets because of an injury to Jerry Reuss. He pitched six innings and allowed only one run. He became a full-fledged starter in the Dodger rotation in July and responded by pitching four complete game shutouts that month, which was good enough to tie for the most in the Majors that season (with Joaquín Andújar and teammate Alejandro Peña). He finished the season with a record of 11–8 and a 2.66 ERA in 45 games (20 starts).

In the 1985 season he led the National League (NL) in winning percentage, compiling a 19–3 record with a 2.03 ERA. The Dodgers won the NL West, and Hershiser finished third in Cy Young Award voting. He also saw his first post-season action, pitching in two games in the 1985 National League Championship Series. In the 1986 season, Hershiser went 14–14 with a 3.85 ERA. The next season he was selected to his first All-Star Game while compiling a 16–16 record with a 3.06 ERA.

Cy Young, scoreless streak, and World Series (1988)
Hershiser started to feel sick playing golf a week before pitchers and catchers reported, and it was discovered he needed an emergency appendectomy. The Dodgers planned to hold him back in spring training, but instead let him go through it normally after he was fine during workouts on day one.

Hershiser in 1988 led the league in wins (23), innings (267), shutouts (8) and complete games (15). He was third in ERA at 2.26. He finished the season with a record 59 consecutive scoreless innings pitched, breaking the mark of  innings, held by former Dodger Don Drysdale. The streak began on August 30, when he pitched four scoreless innings to conclude a game and the record was broken when he pitched 10 shutout innings, on 116 pitches, in the final game of the season. He was selected to his second all-star game and was a unanimous selection for the National League Cy Young Award. He also won the Gold Glove Award for the best fielding pitcher in the National League.

In the 1988 National League Championship Series between Hershiser's Dodgers and the New York Mets, Hershiser not only started Games 1 and 3, but recorded the final out in Game 4 in relief for a save. He then pitched a complete-game shutout in Game 7 and was selected as the NLCS MVP. He then pitched a shutout in Game 2 of the World Series and allowed only two runs in a complete game in the clinching victory in Game 5, winning the World Series MVP Award.

Hershiser is the only player to receive the Cy Young Award, the Championship Series MVP Award, and the World Series MVP Award in the same season. He later received both The Sporting News Pitcher of the Year and Sports Illustrated magazine's Sportsman of the Year award for his accomplishments in 1988.

Final years with Dodgers (1989–1994)

Hershiser signed a new $7.9 million three-year contract with the Dodgers prior to the 1989 season that was the richest three-year contract ever signed to that point.

That season, he made his third straight All-Star team and he had another good year with an ERA of 2.31 in 35 games. However, the Dodgers weren't as good and he suffered from a lack of offensive support. He went 0–7 over one nine-game stretch because the team only scored nine runs total in that period. He had a 15–15 record that season but only evened it out because he pitched 11 innings in the last game of the season and threw 169 pitches. He was determined to stay in until his team took the lead, no matter what the manager wanted.

After just four starts in 1990, it was discovered that Hershiser had a torn labrum in the shoulder of his pitching arm. Dr. Frank Jobe performed shoulder reconstruction surgery on Hershiser on April 27, 1990, the first time the procedure had been performed on a major league player. He did not rejoin the Dodgers until May 29, 1991, a return that he called "a miracle." Two games later, he picked up his 100th career win against the Chicago Cubs on June 9, 1991. In 21 starts, he was 7–2 with a 3.46 ERA.  He won his last six decisions and was selected as the UPI Comeback Player of the Year.

There were still questions about his recovery heading into 1992, but he managed to pitch 33 games in both 1992 and 1993. His numbers were not what they were before the surgery, but he was still effective. He was 10–15 with a 3.67 ERA in 1992 and 12–14 with a 3.59 ERA in 1993. Notably in 1993, Hershiser hit .356 in 83 plate appearances, earning a Silver Slugger Award.

In his final start of 1994, on August 7, Hershiser took a no-hit bid into the sixth inning before it was broken up. The 1994–95 Major League Baseball strike ended the season on August 11.  Hershiser was involved in the negotiations as part of the Major League Baseball Players Association but the strike signaled the end of his time with the Dodgers and he became a free agent.

Cleveland Indians (1995–1997)
Hershiser signed a three-year contract with the Cleveland Indians on April 8, 1995. Indians General Manager John Hart said that the team was looking for a veteran with "character and competitiveness" to show the young players how to play the right way. He went 16–6 with a 3.87 ERA in 26 starts for the Indians in 1995 to lead the young team to their first post-season appearance in 41 years.

Hershiser won the two games he pitched in the 1995 American League Championship Series (ALCS) against the Seattle Mariners and was selected as the ALCS MVP, the first player to have won the LCS MVP Award in both leagues. He also pitched effectively in the 1995 World Series against the Atlanta Braves, though the Indians would lose the series in six games.

He pitched two more seasons for the Indians, and was 14–6 for the 1997 team, including pitching seven shutout innings in Game 3 of the 1997 ALCS. In his final World Series appearance in 1997 he gave up 13 runs in 10 innings and lost 2 games to the Florida Marlins.

Though he pitched for the Indians for only three seasons, Hershiser became something of a folk hero in Cleveland. One memorable image from his tenure is of Hershiser screaming "Take that!" at the Braves dugout after starting a 1–3 double play late in game five of the 1995 World Series.

Later career (1998–2000)
Hershiser signed a one-year $3.45 million contract with the San Francisco Giants on December 7, 1997, but his age was beginning to catch up to him. He made 34 starts and was 11–10 with a 4.41 ERA in 1998. The contract contained an option for 1999 but the Giants declined the option after the season. At the time they said they might come to terms on a new deal. Instead he signed a minor league contract with the Indians on February 20, 1999.

The Indians released him during spring training and he signed with the New York Mets on March 25, 1999. Hershiser made 32 starts with the Mets and was 13–12 with a 4.58 ERA. He served as a mentor to the young pitchers on the Mets staff and helped them make the playoffs by allowing just one run in  innings in a 2–1 win over the Pittsburgh Pirates in the last game of the season. He pitched out of the bullpen in the playoffs as the Mets lost to the Braves in the 1999 National League Championship Series.

Hershiser signed a one-year contract to return to the Dodgers on December 17, 1999. He started the home opener on April 14, 2000, against the Reds and allowed only one run in six strong innings. He struggled after that, allowed 36 runs on 42 hits, 14 walks and 11 hit batters. His 13.14 ERA in 2000 is the worst ERA by any pitcher with 20 or more innings. One day after allowing eight runs in  innings on June 26, he was released by the Dodgers.

Pitching style
Hershiser was not an overpowering pitcher, but he developed a variety of pitches and outthought hitters. Hershiser explained his pitch repertoire in 1989 as follows:
I have a sinking fastball to either side of the plate, a cutter (which changes the direction of my fastball so it breaks instead of sinking) to either side of the plate, a curveball I throw at three speeds and three angles, a straight change—using the same arm speed and position as a fastball but with a grip and a release that slows it dramatically, and changeups to different locations that I throw off my sinker which look like batting practice fastballs. Different locations, different speeds, and slightly different arm angles on all those pitches give me a wide palette of choices.
By 1999, he noted that his pitches were not as sharp, so he added a slider to the mix. He also emphasized locating his pitches in good spots: "You'll hear pitchers say, 'I had great stuff and got shelled,' but you never hear them say, 'I had great location and got shelled.

Post-retirement

Hershiser remained with the Dodgers briefly as a player-personnel consultant. He went to AAA Albuquerque and filed one report but there wasn't much for him to do so he left the position.

He was subsequently hired to work on broadcasts of the Little League World Series for ABC and ESPN in 2000–2001. He also worked on Wednesday Night Baseball for ESPN during the 2001 season.

Hershiser left that position to join the Texas Rangers as a special assistant to General Manager John Hart in fall of 2001 and was named as the Rangers pitching coach on June 22, 2002. In October 2005 Hershiser was mentioned as a candidate to replace Jim Tracy as manager of the Dodgers, but the position went to Grady Little. He was also mentioned as a possible replacement for Ken Macha of the Oakland Athletics; however, he was ultimately passed over for Bob Geren. He left his position of Rangers pitching coach after the 2005 season to become an executive director of the Rangers, reporting to Club President Jeff Cogen. He did not last long in that position as he quit on February 3, 2006.

On February 13, 2006, Hershiser rejoined ESPN as an analyst for Baseball Tonight, Sunday Night Baseball, and the Little League World Series.

Through a group that included fellow former Dodger Steve Garvey, Hershiser became involved in the bidding process for the Dodgers when the team was up for sale in 2011–12. His group did not make it past the first round of the bidding.

In 2014, Hershiser left ESPN and rejoined the Dodgers as a television analyst for their new regional sports network SportsNet LA. At the time, he teamed with Charley Steiner and Nomar Garciaparra to call Dodger road games not played in California when Vin Scully reduced his travel. Since 2017, he has worked with Joe Davis as the primary broadcast team for Dodger baseball following Scully's retirement at the end of the 2016 season.

Poker
Hershiser started playing poker competitively in 2006. After retirement from baseball he moved to Summerlin, Nevada and befriended a poker instructor. He became a regular at Red Rock's poker room in Summerlin, playing $2–$5 No Limit Hold'em.

Hershiser signed with Poker Royalty to represent his poker career.  He was invited to participate in the 2008 NBC National Heads-Up Poker Championship. Playing under the PokerStars banner, Hershiser stunned the poker world by making the quarterfinals, defeating 2006 event champion Ted Forrest, Allen Cunningham, and Freddy Deeb—players who had won a total of 12 World Series of Poker bracelets heading into the event. Andy Bloch defeated him in the quarterfinals.

Hershiser has played in a number of events, including the 2008 World Series of Poker and the 2009 PokerStars Caribbean Adventure. Hershiser won $54,570 on September 7, 2008, by taking ninth place in the $10,000 Pokerstars World Championship of Online Poker Event 5. Hershiser also has made a tradition of giving an autographed baseball to the poker player who eliminates him.

Personal life
Hershiser and his first wife, Jamie Byars, divorced in 2005. They have two sons, Orel Leonard V (known as Quinton) and Jordan. In 2010 Hershiser married his second wife, Dana Deaver. Jordan graduated from St. Mark's School of Texas in 2007, where he earned all-conference honors in baseball and basketball, and played college baseball at the University of Southern California as a pitcher and first baseman. Despite his college career being hampered by injuries, Jordan was drafted by the Dodgers in the 34th round of the 2012 MLB draft. Hershiser and Deaver live in Las Vegas with Deaver's two children.

Hershiser is an active Christian. He was a guest star on the 1992 episode of the Christian children's video series McGee and Me! "Take Me Out of the Ball Game". On an appearance on The Tonight Show after the 1988 World Series, Johnny Carson talked him into singing hymns for the audience.

Books

See also

List of Major League Baseball individual streaks
List of Major League Baseball career wins leaders
List of Major League Baseball annual wins leaders
List of Major League Baseball career hit batsmen leaders
List of Major League Baseball career strikeout leaders

References

External links

Pura Pelota (Venezuelan Winter League)
Archive at Los Angeles Times

1958 births
Living people
Albuquerque Dukes players
American League Championship Series MVPs
Bakersfield Dodgers players
Baseball players from New Jersey
Bowling Green Falcons baseball players
Bowling Green State University alumni
Cherry Hill High School East alumni
Cleveland Indians players
Clinton Dodgers players
Cy Young Award winners
Gold Glove Award winners
Los Angeles Dodgers announcers
Los Angeles Dodgers players
Major League Baseball broadcasters
Major League Baseball pitchers
Major League Baseball pitching coaches
World Series Most Valuable Player Award winners
National League All-Stars
National League Championship Series MVPs
National League wins champions
Navegantes del Magallanes players
American expatriate baseball players in Venezuela
New York Mets players
People from Cherry Hill, New Jersey
San Antonio Dodgers players
San Antonio Missions players
San Bernardino Stampede players
San Francisco Giants players
Silver Slugger Award winners
Baseball players from Buffalo, New York
Baseball players from Dallas
Sportspeople from Camden County, New Jersey
Sportspeople from the Delaware Valley
Sportspeople from Winter Park, Florida
Texas Rangers coaches
People from Summerlin, Nevada